Pierre-Emerick Emiliano François Aubameyang  (born 18 June 1989) is a professional footballer who plays as a striker for Premier League club Chelsea. He is renowned for his pace, finishing, and off-ball movement. Born in France, he is a former Gabonese international and is the country's all-time top goalscorer.

The son of Pierre Aubameyang, Pierre-Emerick began his senior club career playing for Italian club AC Milan, but never appeared for the club as he went on a series of loan spells in France. He moved to Saint-Étienne in 2011. There, he won a Coupe de la Ligue title and joined Borussia Dortmund in 2013. In Germany, Aubameyang finished as the league's top goalscorer in the 2016–17 season and won a DFB-Pokal. He also ranks as the club's seventh highest all-time goalscorer. In 2018, Aubameyang was the subject of a then-club record association football transfer when signed for Arsenal in a transfer worth £56 million (€60 million), making him the most expensive Gabonese player of all time. With Arsenal, he won an FA Cup and finished as the league's joint-top goalscorer in the 2018–19 season. In 2022, Aubameyang joined Barcelona after his Arsenal contract was cancelled by mutual consent. However, he returned to the Premier League after he signed for Chelsea at the end of the summer transfer window.

Aubameyang is Gabon's all-time top goalscorer. He made his senior debut for Gabon in 2009 aged 19, and appeared in four Africa Cup of Nations tournaments and the 2012 Summer Olympics. In 2016, Aubameyang was named African Footballer of the Year; the first Gabonese and second European-born player to win the award.

Club career

AC Milan

Aubameyang joined AC Milan's youth academy in January 2007. In August, he was part of the squad that finished fourth in the inaugural Champions Youth Cup held in Malaysia, where he made a name for himself and attracted the attention of scouts internationally. He scored against every opponent Milan played, finishing with seven goals in six matches.

2008–09: Loan to Dijon
For the 2008–09 season, Aubameyang was loaned out to Dijon of Ligue 2 in France to gain first team experience. His performances there led him to appear in World Soccer's Talent Scout section in Summer 2009. He finished with a total of ten goals and two assists in all competitions, including two goals in a Coupe de France tie against Selongey.

2009–10: Loan to Lille
On 24 June 2009, it was announced Ligue 1 club Lille had decided to sign Aubameyang on loan. Relative to his previous season, however, Aubameyang did not perform as well, scoring just two goals in 14 appearances, four as a starter.

2010–11: Loans to Monaco and Saint-Étienne
For the 2010–11 season, Aubameyang was loaned for the season to Monaco. On 21 August 2010, he scored his first goal for Monaco in an away match against Lens, then scored again on 29 August at home to Auxerre, where Monaco won 2–0. In January 2011, after six months with the club, Aubameyang was loaned to Saint-Étienne until the end of the 2010–11 season, finishing the season with four goals and three assists. In July 2011, the loan was extended for the entire 2011–12 season.

Saint-Étienne

On 22 December 2011, Aubameyang signed with Saint-Étienne on a permanent deal. He was quickly added to the starting line up and was given the number 7 jersey. In February 2012, he scored his first hat-trick against Lorient. He became an integral part of the squad, scoring half of the team's away goals during the season, and went on to be Ligue 1's 4th top scorer having scored 16 goals behind Montpellier's Giroud with 21, PSG's Nenê with 21 too and Lille's Eden Hazard with 20.

On 20 April 2013, Aubameyang was in the starting line-up for Saint-Étienne in the 2013 Coupe de la Ligue Final. Les Verts won the match 1–0 with a goal from Brandão to give Aubameyang his first major trophy as a professional footballer. He finished the season with 18 goals and seven assists in all competitions.

In the 2012–13 season, Aubameyang ended second in the competition's top-goalscorers list, scoring 19 goals and finishing behind only Zlatan Ibrahimović. From his 37 appearances, he also provided eight assists. The season was widely regarded as his breakout year—he appeared in the Ligue 1 team of the season and he won the Ligue 1 African Player of the Year award.

Borussia Dortmund

2013–15: DFL-Supercups

On 4 July 2013, Aubameyang joined 2012–13 Champions League finalists Borussia Dortmund on a five-year contract. He made his competitive debut for his new club on 27 July 2013 against Bayern Munich in the DFL-Supercup, replacing Jakub Błaszczykowski for the last 18 minutes of Dortmund's 4–2 victory, assisting Dortmund's final goal, scored by Marco Reus. On 10 August, Aubameyang made his Bundesliga debut and scored a hat-trick against FC Augsburg, including a goal from his first shot in the league. In the process, Aubameyang also became the first Gabonese player to appear in the Bundesliga. On 27 November, he scored his first Champions League goal in a 3–1 win against Napoli in the group stage of the 2013–14 competition. He later took a penalty against 1860 Munich that propelled Dortmund into the next round of the 2013–14 DFB-Pokal, finishing the year with 13 league goals and 16 goals in all competitions.

On 13 August 2014, Aubameyang assisted Borussia Dortmund's first goal and scored the second goal in a 2–0 victory over Bayern Munich in the DFL-Supercup. After scoring the goal, he celebrated by putting on a Spider-Man mask. In Dortmund's next match, a 4–1 win over Stuttgarter Kickers in the first round of the DFB-Pokal, Aubameyang scored two-second-half goals and provided the assist for Adrián Ramos' goal. On 13 September, Aubameyang scored his first Bundesliga goal of the season, netting Dortmund's final goal of their 3–1 win over SC Freiburg. Three days later, Aubameyang scored Dortmund's second goal in a 2–0 win over future club Arsenal in the first group match of the Champions League.

Aubameyang ended his second season in Dortmund with 25 goals from 46 appearances, including one in the 2015 DFB-Pokal Final, where Dortmund were defeated 3–1 by VfL Wolfsburg at the Olympiastadion.

2015–16: League runner-up
On 31 July 2015, Aubameyang signed a new contract to last until 2020, saying, "Every part of me wants to be here and I have never wanted to leave." On 20 August, he scored a brace as Dortmund came from 0–3 down to win 3–4 at Odds BK in the first leg of their Europa League play-off. By scoring in Dortmund's 1–1 draw with 1899 Hoffenheim on 23 September, Aubameyang became the first player in Bundesliga history to score in each of his team's opening six matches of a season. He later extended this record to eight matches, scoring in the team's next two fixtures against Darmstadt 98 and Bayern Munich, before failing to score for the first time in the Bundesliga season in a 2–0 win at Mainz 05.

On 22 October, Aubameyang scored a hat-trick in a UEFA Europa League match against Gabala of Azerbaijan. Three days later, he scored another hat-trick in a 5–1 defeat of Augsburg at the Westfalenstadion. On 8 November, Aubameyang scored the winning goal for Dortmund in a 3–2 Revierderby victory over rivals FC Schalke 04. At the halfway stage of the Bundesliga season, Aubameyang was the league's top scorer with 18 goals from 17 appearances.

On 30 January 2016, Aubameyang scored his 19th and 20th league goals of the season to give Dortmund a 2–0 home victory over FC Ingolstadt. Aubameyang reached 30 goals in all competitions in a 3–1 victory over VfB Stuttgart in the quarter-final of the 2015–16 DFB-Pokal. In addition to scoring himself, he assisted the side's other two goals scored by Marco Reus and Henrikh Mkhitaryan. On 10 March 2016, Aubameyang scored for Borussia in their 3–0 win over Tottenham Hotspur in the UEFA Europa League Round of 16 first-leg. A week later, he scored both goals in the 2–1 second-leg victory at White Hart Lane, taking him to 35 goals for the season. In scoring two goals in a 5–1 win against VfL Wolfsburg on 30 April, Aubameyang reached 25 goals in the Bundesliga season, thus ending as the league's second-top scorer behind Robert Lewandowski of Bayern Munich.

2016–17: Bundesliga top goalscorer and DFB-Pokal

Aubameyang began his 2016–17 season in the Bundesliga with a double against Mainz 05 on 27 August in a 2–1 victory, while also scoring twice against VfL Wolfsburg on 20 September. Aubameyang scored three days later against recently promoted SC Freiburg, bringing his season total to 5, into a tie atop the scoring charts with Lewandowski early in the season. Following an injury to Marcel Schmelzer, Aubameyang wore the captain's armband for Dortmund for the first time on 22 October, also scoring a goal in the 3–3 draw at FC Ingolstadt.

Aubameyang also got off to an excellent start in Dortmund's Champions League group stage matches, scoring in each of their first leg matches as Dortmund were joint top of their group with Real Madrid. However, Aubameyang was left out of the squad by Thomas Tuchel for their return leg against Sporting CP on 2 November due to an "internal issue". It turned out that he received a one-game suspension for breaking club rules, by traveling to Milan instead of staying in Dortmund. Expected to return that weekend at Hamburger SV, Aubameyang exploded with a four-goal performance in a 5–2 victory, their first in five tries in the Bundesliga, while also assisting Ousmane Dembélé for Dortmund's final goal.

On 19 November, Aubameyang scored the only goal of a 1–0 win over Bayern Munich at the Westfalenstadion. This was Dortmund's first Klassiker victory in the league since April 2014. On 7 December, Aubameyang scored Borussia's first goal in a 2–2 comeback draw with Real Madrid at the Santiago Bernabéu Stadium to secure qualification to the next stage as group winners. On 16 December, Aubameyang scored his 100th goal for Borussia Dortmund in a 2–2 draw away to 1899 Hoffenheim.

On 4 March 2017, Aubameyang passed 20 Bundesliga goals for the second consecutive season with two goals in a 6–2 defeat of Bayer Leverkusen. Four days later, he scored a hat-trick in a 4–0 win over Benfica to put Dortmund into the quarter-finals of the Champions League. On 20 May, Aubameyang scored twice in Borussia's final day defeat of Werder Bremen to end the season as the Bundesliga's top scorer with 31 goals. In the final of the 2016–17 DFB-Pokal on 27 May 2017 he scored the winning goal, a penalty, as Dortmund beat Eintracht Frankfurt 2–1.

Arsenal
On 31 January 2018, Aubameyang signed for Premier League club, Arsenal, for a then-club-record fee, reported to be £56 million.

2017–2019: Debut season, Premier League Golden Boot

On 3 February, Aubameyang made his debut for Arsenal against Everton in the Premier League in a 5–1 home victory, scoring the team's fourth goal, chipping the ball over a grounded Jordan Pickford. After missing the Europa League matches against Östersunds FK for the Gunners due to being cup-tied, Aubameyang registered his first away goal for the club in the team's 2–1 away defeat to Brighton & Hove Albion. Aubameyang registered his first assist for the team, setting up Henrikh Mkhitaryan's goal in a 3–0 win over Watford, Aubameyang also scored the Gunners' second goal (which was assisted by Mkhitaryan), rounding the goalkeeper.

Aubameyang kept up his fine goalscoring form by scoring twice in Arsenal's 3–0 home win against Stoke City. Aubameyang's goals against Stoke (one of which was also his first converted penalty for the club) made him the first player to score five times in his first six games for the club. He netted his second brace for Arsenal, in manager Arsène Wenger's final home game for the club, opening and closing the scoring, whilst also assisting Alex Iwobi's goal, in an eventual 5–0 win over Burnley. Aubameyang followed this up by scoring the only goal in Arsenal's 1–0 away win against Huddersfield Town. Aubameyang ended the season with ten goals and four assists in thirteen Premier League games and was the last goalscorer for Arsenal under Arsène Wenger.

Aubameyang scored his first goal of the following season in a 3–2 away win over Cardiff City on 2 September 2018. After a flick from Alexandre Lacazette, Aubameyang took a touch before curling the ball past the Cardiff goalkeeper. Aubameyang's strike from outside the box ended his personal run of 76 consecutive goals from inside the box in club football and was also his 150th goal in league football. Aubameyang made his European debut for Arsenal, in the 4–2 home win over Vorskla Poltava, scoring two goals, before being substituted for Mesut Özil in the 57th minute. Aubameyang's goals meant that he had been directly involved in 12 goals in 10 appearances for Arsenal at the Emirates Stadium. By October 2018, Aubameyang had tallied 16 goals in Premier League play since joining Arsenal in February. According to Opta statistics, that gave him a minutes per goal ratio of 104.6, which set the record for the best minutes per goal ratio in Premier League history (minimum 10 goals).

Aubameyang became the first player to reach 10 goals in the Premier League that season, following a brace in Arsenal's 4–2 victory over Tottenham Hotspur in the North London derby on 2 December. Aubameyang scored the Gunners' opening goal from the penalty spot and later curled a shot past Hugo Lloris in the second-half; he also grabbed an assist for Arsenal's fourth goal, which was Lucas Torreira's first goal for the club. The victory took Arsenal above Tottenham in the Premier League on goal difference.

Aubameyang scored his first Arsenal hat-trick in the club's 4–2 win over Valencia on 9 May 2019. Aubameyang also set up the Gunners' second goal, scored by Alexandre Lacazette. Aubameyang's hat-trick meant that Arsenal reached the Europa League final, making it the club's second European final in thirteen years. It also saw him become the first Arsenal player to score a hat-trick in the semi-finals of a European competition.

Aubameyang finished the season with two goals in a 3–1 away win at Burnley, meaning he ended the season sharing the Premier League Golden Boot title with Liverpool's Mohamed Salah and Sadio Mané, on 22 goals. He played the full 90 minutes in Arsenal's 4–1 defeat to Chelsea in the Europa League, failing to make a significant impact as the result meant Arsenal missed out on Champions League qualification.

2019–2022: FA Cup win and departure

On 11 August 2019, Aubameyang scored his and Arsenal's first goal of the season in their 1–0 opening match victory over Newcastle United at St James' Park, in which he demonstrated perfect technique to cushion a cross from Ainsley Maitland-Niles, to slot the ball past Martin Dúbravka, with José Mourinho hailing the strike as "a moment of genius". Aubameyang scored his first home goal of the campaign in Arsenal's next game, a 2–1 win over Burnley on 17 August. Aubameyang scored what turned out to be the winning goal, following an assist from Dani Ceballos. Aubameyang scored his first European goal of the season on 19 September against Eintracht Frankfurt in the Europa League, as Arsenal won 3–0 away from home on matchday 1.

Aubameyang's five goals in September, including equalizers against Tottenham and Manchester United and the winner against Aston Villa, saw him named the Premier League Player of the Month, beating the likes of Liverpool's Trent Alexander-Arnold, Tottenham's Son Heung-min and Manchester City duo Kevin De Bruyne and Riyad Mahrez to the award. On 5 November 2019, after Granit Xhaka was stripped of the Arsenal captaincy following his angry reaction to getting booed by the Arsenal supporters during their Premier League game against Crystal Palace, head coach Unai Emery confirmed that Aubameyang would take over as the new Arsenal captain.

On 1 December, following the dismissal of Emery, Aubameyang scored both goals in Arsenal's eventual 2–2 draw with Norwich City in interim head coach Freddie Ljungberg's first game in charge. Aubameyang's first goal (a penalty) had to be retaken, after VAR discovered there to be encroachment in the penalty area. Aubameyang's first effort was kept out by goalkeeper Tim Krul, however, his second effort (the same side as his previous attempt), was successfully converted.

Aubameyang scored in Arsenal's 1–1 draw with Crystal Palace on 11 January 2020, but was also sent off for a late challenge on Palace midfielder Max Meyer. Aubameyang was originally given a yellow card for the tackle by referee Paul Tierney, however the card was eventually upgraded to a red card, by the VAR, resulting in Aubameyang's first-ever red card for the Gunners and would mean that the striker would miss Arsenal's next three matches against Sheffield United, Chelsea, and Arsenal's FA Cup tie against Bournemouth.

On 27 February, in Arsenal's Europa League second leg round of 32 match against Olympiacos and with the aggregate score tied at 1–1, Aubameyang's scissor kick goal in extra time allowed his side to equalize the match and lead the tie on aggregate. However, following a 119th-minute goal by Olympiacos that meant Arsenal would be heading out of the competition, Aubameyang missed an open shot from five yards out in the last seconds of the match that would have seen his side through. Following Arsenal's elimination, Aubameyang apologized for and lamented his miss, stating, "I feel very, very bad. It can happen but I do not know how I missed this chance. I was tired, I had some cramps but it is not an excuse."

Following the resumption of the league in the wake of the COVID-19 pandemic, Aubameyang did not score or assist in the first three Premier League games after the restart for Arsenal, but eventually netted a brace on 1 July against Norwich City in a 4–0 rout. Aubameyang's first goal was his 50th in the league for Arsenal, making him the quickest player to reach 50 goals for the club in the Premier League era, having achieved the feat in just 79 league appearances, four games quicker than all-time club goalscorer Thierry Henry, and also became the sixth fastest to 50 in the Premier League, behind Andy Cole, Alan Shearer, Ruud van Nistelrooy, Fernando Torres and Mohamed Salah. Aubameyang also assisted the Gunners' second goal, which was scored by Granit Xhaka. He ended the season with 22 league goals, one behind Jamie Vardy, the winner of the Golden Boot, and tied with Danny Ings for second place.

On 18 July, in their FA Cup semi-final against defending champions Manchester City, Aubameyang scored both goals in a 2–0 win for Arsenal, sending them to the final. On 1 August, he converted a penalty and scored the winner in the final, as Arsenal defeated Chelsea 2–1 and Aubameyang lifted his first trophy with the club, becoming the first African to win the FA Cup as a captain.

On 29 August 2020, Aubameyang scored a goal in normal time and the fifth and winning penalty in a shoot-out win against Liverpool in the Community Shield, after the game ended 1–1. On 12 September, he scored in the first league game of the new season the final goal of a 3–0 win away to Fulham. On 15 September, Aubameyang signed a new three-year contract with Arsenal. On 1 November, he scored a penalty in a 1–0 away win against Manchester United, to grant Arsenal their first Premier League win at Old Trafford since 2006.

Aubameyang scored two goals for Arsenal in their 3–0 victory over Newcastle United on 18 January 2021. However, he did not play in the club's next three matches, in order to tend to his ill mother. On 14 February, Aubameyang scored his first Premier League hat-trick in a 4–2 win over Leeds United. This took him to 200 career goals across Europe's top five leagues. On 25 February, he scored two goals against Benfica in a 3–2 win to secure a place in the Europa League round of 16. On 14 March, Aubameyang was left out of the starting line up in the North London Derby against Tottenham, the manager citing disciplinary reasons.

On matchday 16 of the 2021–22 season, Aubameyang was omitted from the squad for Arsenal's match against Southampton, with manager Mikel Arteta yet again citing disciplinary reasons. Three days later, Aubameyang was stripped of the captaincy. On 1 February 2022, Arsenal announced Aubameyang's departure from the club by mutual consent.

Barcelona
On 2 February 2022, Barcelona reached an agreement for Aubameyang to join the club. Aubameyang signed a contract until 30 June 2025 with an option to agree departure on 30 June 2023. The deal also included a buyout clause of €100 million (£83.4 million). Aubameyang made his debut for Barcelona on 6 February 2022, coming on as a substitute in a 4–2 win over Atlético Madrid. On 20 February, he scored his first competitive goals in his fourth match for Barcelona, scoring a hat-trick in a 4–1 away win at Mestalla Stadium over Valencia in a man of the match performance. On 20 March 2022 Aubameyang scored a brace and assisted Ferran Torres in his first El Clásico helping Barcelona to a 4–0 away victory against the league leaders.

Chelsea 
On 2 September 2022, Chelsea announced the signing of Aubameyang to join the club on a two-year contract. Barcelona confirmed the fee was €12 million (£10.3 million). Aubameyang made his Chelsea debut on 6 September, after being named a starter in a 1–0 Champions League defeat to Dinamo Zagreb. On 1 October, he made his league debut for the club and scored his first goal in a 2–1 away win against Crystal Palace. In the Champions League group stage, he scored two goals in two matches against his former club AC Milan.

International career

Aubameyang was invited to play for Italy U19s after a good season with Dijon, but he debuted for the France under-21 team in February 2009 in a friendly match against Tunisia U21.

Aubameyang was also eligible to play for Spain because he has Spanish nationality. He decided to represent Gabon because his father once captained the team, but he maintains close relationship with Spain and expressed a desire to play in La Liga prior to signing for FC Barcelona.

On 25 March 2009, Aubameyang was selected for the Gabon national team and made his debut for the squad. He scored his first goal in a 2–1 victory over Morocco, then scored a goal each in friendly matches against Benin, Togo, Algeria and Senegal.

Aubameyang was a key member of the Gabon national side that reached the quarter-finals of the 2012 Africa Cup of Nations as co-hosts of the competition. He netted three goals in total, finishing the tournament as one of the top scorers. On 5 February 2012, he set up the opening goal for his team and hit the post in the quarter-final against Mali. However, the match ended 1–1 after extra time and Aubameyang had his penalty saved in the shootout to decide the game.

In July 2012, Aubameyang represented Gabon at the 2012 Summer Olympics in London. He scored in the team's opening game against Switzerland, which was Gabon's first-ever Olympic goal, and would also prove to be Gabon's only goal of the tournament. They were eliminated in the group stage.

On 15 June 2013, Aubameyang scored a hat-trick of penalty kicks in Gabon's 4–1 2014 FIFA World Cup qualifying win over Niger. He then scored a brace against Burkina Faso in the 2015 Africa Cup of Nations Qualification.

Aubameyang captained Gabon at the 2015 Africa Cup of Nations, scoring the team's opening goal of the tournament in their 2–0 win over Burkina Faso on 17 January 2015. He also scored a brace against Mali on 25 March 2015. He is Gabon's highest goalscorer. He rejected a callup for a pivotal World Cup qualifier at home to the Ivory Coast, which they lost 3–0.

On 25 March 2021, Aubameyang captained Gabon to a 3–0 win at home to DR Congo, scoring the third goal to ensure qualification to the African Cup of Nations to be staged in Cameroon. In that time, he contracted malaria, in which he got a fever and had to be hospitalized.

On 6 January 2022, Aubameyang tested positive for COVID-19 before Gabon's first game in the African Cup of Nations. Aubameyang withdrew from the tournament a few days later to undergo further medical examinations in England after being diagnosed with heart lesions.

On 18 May 2022, Aubameyang announced his retirement from international football. He made a total of 72 appearances for the Gabon national team and scored 30 goals.

Media
Aubameyang was involved in the Amazon Original sports docuseries All or Nothing: Arsenal, which documented the club by spending time with the coaching staff and players behind the scenes both on and off the field throughout their 2021–22 season.

Produced by Fulwell 73, FIFA released Captains in 2022, an eight-part sports docuseries following six national team captains in their respective 2022 FIFA World Cup qualification campaigns. Aubameyang, representing Gabon, starred alongside Thiago Silva (Brazil), Luka Modrić (Croatia), Andre Blake (Jamaica), Hassan Maatouk (Lebanon) and Brian Kaltak (Vanuatu). It was released by Netflix and also shown on FIFA's own streaming platform, FIFA+.

Personal life
Aubameyang was born in Laval, France. He is the son of former Gabonese international footballer Pierre Aubameyang and younger half-brother of Catilina and Willy, who have both played for Milan's youth teams. His mother is Spanish.
He is married to Alysha Behague, the couple have two sons, Curtys and Pierre. In August 2022, Aubameyang suffered a broken jaw during a violent robbery of his home in Barcelona.

He is multilingual and speaks French, English, Spanish, Italian, and German.

Career statistics

Club

International

Scores and results list Gabon's goal tally first, score column indicates score after each Aubameyang goal.

Honours

Saint-Étienne
Coupe de la Ligue: 2012–13

Borussia Dortmund
DFB-Pokal: 2016–17; runner-up: 2013–14, 2014–15, 2015–16
DFL-Supercup: 2013, 2014

Arsenal
FA Cup: 2019–20
FA Community Shield: 2020
EFL Cup runner-up: 2017–18
UEFA Europa League runner-up: 2018–19

Gabon
King's Cup third place: 2018

Individual
Ligue 1 Best African Player: 2012–13
UNFP Ligue 1 Team of the Year: 2012–13
UNFP Ligue 1 Player of the Month: February 2012, October 2012, February 2013
CAF Team of the Year: 2013, 2014, 2015, 2016, 2018, 2019
Prix Marc-Vivien Foé: 2013
UEFA Europa League Squad of the Season: 2015–16, 2018–19
Borussia Dortmund Player of the Season: 2014–15
Bundesliga Team of the Season: 2016–17
African Footballer of the Year: 2015
Bundesliga Player of the Year: 2015–16
Facebook FA Bundesliga Player of the Year: 2016
Bundesliga top scorer: 2016–17
Premier League Player of the Month: October 2018, September 2019
Premier League Golden Boot: 2018–19 (shared)
Arsenal Player of the Season Award: 2019–20
PFA Team of the Year: 2019–20 Premier League
IFFHS CAF Men Team of The Year: 2020
IFFHS CAF Men's Team of the Decade 2011–2020

Orders
Commander of the National Order of Merit of Gabon: 2016

See also

References

External links

Profile at the Chelsea F.C. website
Profile at the Premier League website

1989 births
Living people
People from Laval, Mayenne
Sportspeople from Mayenne
French footballers
Gabonese footballers
Association football forwards
OGC Nice players
Stade Lavallois players
FC Rouen players
SC Bastia players
A.C. Milan players
Dijon FCO players
Lille OSC players
AS Monaco FC players
AS Saint-Étienne players
Borussia Dortmund players
Arsenal F.C. players
FC Barcelona players
Chelsea F.C. players
Ligue 2 players
Ligue 1 players
Bundesliga players
Premier League players
La Liga players
France under-21 international footballers
Gabon international footballers
2010 Africa Cup of Nations players
2012 Africa Cup of Nations players
2015 Africa Cup of Nations players
2017 Africa Cup of Nations players
Olympic footballers of Gabon
Footballers at the 2012 Summer Olympics
African Footballer of the Year winners
Kicker-Torjägerkanone Award winners
First Division/Premier League top scorers
FA Cup Final players
French expatriate footballers
Gabonese expatriate footballers
Expatriate footballers in Italy
Expatriate footballers in Monaco
Expatriate footballers in Germany
Expatriate footballers in England
Expatriate footballers in Spain
French expatriate sportspeople in England
French expatriate sportspeople in Germany
French expatriate sportspeople in Italy
French expatriate sportspeople in Monaco
French expatriate sportspeople in Spain
Gabonese expatriate sportspeople in England
Gabonese expatriate sportspeople in Germany
Gabonese expatriate sportspeople in Italy
Gabonese expatriate sportspeople in Monaco
Gabonese expatriate sportspeople in Spain
French sportspeople of Gabonese descent
French people of Spanish descent
Gabonese people of Spanish descent
People with acquired Gabonese citizenship
Footballers from Pays de la Loire
Black French sportspeople
Recipients of orders, decorations, and medals by Gabon